Johannes Gerhardus "John" Williams (born 29 October 1946) is a former South African rugby union player and coach.

Playing career
He made his test debut for the Springboks in 1971 against the touring French team on 12 June 1971 at the Free State Stadium in Bloemfontein. He also played test matches against Australia in 1971, England in 1972, the British Lions in 1974 and the 1976 All Blacks. He played in a further eleven tour matches, scoring one try for the Springboks.

Test history

Coaching career
Williams was the Northern Transvaal coach from 1987 to 1991 and coached his team to the Currie Cup final in each year. In 1992 Williams was appointed as Springbok coach.

See also
 List of South Africa national rugby union players – Springbok no. 450

References

1946 births
Living people
South African rugby union players
South Africa international rugby union players
Blue Bulls players
South African rugby union coaches
South Africa national rugby union team coaches
Rugby union players from Johannesburg
Rugby union locks